Brasse-Camarade was a Canadian francophone rock group from Ontario, in the 1990s.

The band's two core members, brothers François and Pierre Lamoureux, were born in Sudbury, and later lived in Toronto, Ottawa and Penetanguishene before moving to Montreal to study music at McGill University. They subsequently released their first album in 1993, and released four more albums before ending the band in 1999.  They were renowned for creating and organizing a comprehensive network of venues based around schools across Canada.  One of such networks eventually became Réseau Ontario.  Brasse-Camarade played over 500 concerts all over North-America from Alabama and Louisiana to Yellowknife and from Vancouver to Baie St-Marie in Nova Scotia.  They also toured Portugal, Açores and France. The band had a few top ten hits but due to their Franco-Ontarian roots, were systematically blocked by certain radio-stations in Québec and some program directors were actually very vocal about it.  After meeting with one such program director who re-iterated that he would never play them on his station (one of the biggest in Canada) because they were from Ontario,  they decided to go where they were gaining momentum and that was Portugal.  In the end, this led to Pierre and François attracting attention and eventually paved the way for a move to New York City and the creation of FogoLabs Corp.  The irony is that they had tens of thousands of fans from the non stop touring (they would fill out theatres) but had no way of leveraging that with Radio or Television and that they stopped the band right at the dawn of the internet.  In the case of Brasse-Camarade, Social Media would have made a huge difference to turn the tide with Radio in Québec.

The Lamoureux brothers created FogoLabs Corp and Cinemusica. Both production companies that specialize in concert films including releases for Rush, Branford Marsalis, The Who, Cowboy Junkies, Brian Setzer, Pat Metheny, Joe Satriani, Peter Frampton and Willie Nelson.

Their Zappa Plays Zappa concert film earned a Grammy for Best Instrumental Rock Performance. Pierre and François Lamoureux also won the JUNO AWARD for MUSIC DVD OF THE YEAR on two occasions, once with The Tragically Hip (That Night In Toronto) and once with Billy Talent (666). The Lamoureux brothers also directed and produced Harry Connick, Jr.'s "Only You - The Concert" and "In Concert On Broadway" concert films. Both films earned Emmy Awards for Outstanding Music Direction. In addition, films by Pierre and François have earned a multitude of industry awards including two Gemini Awards with Cowboy Junkies, DVD Association Awards, DVD Award and Surround Music Awards for their various concert films with Rush, Branford Marsalis, Willie Nelson, The Stray Cats and The Brian Setzer Orchestra.

In 2010, the brothers created Cinemusica, a production company entirely dedicated to their creative projects in the creative and performing arts. FogoLabs has since evolved into a full audiovisual production company that go beyond concert films. FogoLabs recently produced broadcasts of the Frangrance Industry Fifi Awards, the NEA Jazz Masters Awards and other live events.  FogoLabs Corp currently produces the Front and Center as well as the Speakeasy series on PBS with Pierre and François Directing and François handling mixing.  Artists on the series range from Joe Satriani to Christina Perri to Alt-J to Lady Antebellum.

Brasse-Camarade is currently considering reuniting. A box set is also planned with no release date yet announced.

Members
 François Lamoureux: vocals, guitars
 Pierre Lamoureux : bass

Drummers
 Arnold Bondi (until 1993)
 Jim Pistilli (1993-1994)
 Tim Rideout (1994–1995)
 Francois Paré (1996)
 Shawn Sasyniuk (1997–1999)

Other drummers to have performed and or recorded with Brasse-Camarade include Jo Anne Blondin, Pierre Pineault, Claude Desjardins, Martin Gaboury, Marc-André Fortin and Pascal Racine.

Discography
1993: Brasse-Camarade
1994: Fonce!
1996: Princesse des Bayous
1996: "Mas Voltarei" (Portuguese, English and French album.)
1997: Les étrangers
1997: Mil Razoes (Portuguese album)
1998: Rêve et réalité (5-song EP)
1998: Mil Razoes/Mille raisons (Singles)
1998: Tard/Éternel/Éterno (Singles)

References

External links
  Francophonies canadiennes: Brasse-Camarade
  National Film Board: summary of Brasse-Camarade documentary
  APCM: Pierre Lamoureux receives Prix Hommage (Franco-Ontarian music honour)
  APCM discography
  University of Ottawa: Brasse-Camarade profile

Musical groups established in 1993
Musical groups disestablished in 1999
Musical groups from Greater Sudbury
Canadian folk rock groups
Franco-Ontarian musical groups
1993 establishments in Ontario
1999 disestablishments in Ontario